Henry Menezes (born 30 April 1964 in Mumbai) is a former India national football team goalkeeper, Menezes has been awarded the prestigious Shiv Chhatrapati Award the highest state award for excellence in sports by the Government of Maharastra. He is a Governing Council Member at the International Sports University, Maharashtra, and has also served as the CEO of the Western India Football Association (WIFA), which is the governing body for football in the state of Maharashtra; affiliated to the AIFF and Deputy chairman of AIFF technical committee.

Playing career

Menezes started his journey in football at age 15, represented Maharashtra state under 19 in 1979-80 and again in 1980-81 in two years he was ready to go professional.
Menezes played as a goalkeeper and his professional career started with Mafatlal sports club in Mumbai at the age of 17 in 1982. After spending one season there, he moved to Bank of India football team where he spent five years. In 1988 he joined Mahindra United and stayed there until 1995, during which time he was the most successful captain of the club, he represented the India national football team. In Mahindra United his professional playing career ended, and he began a management career.

Managerial career
Menezes was the General Manager of Mahindra United Football Club, Mumbai which was disbanded in 2010, Menezes was instrumental in creating Mumbai FC and was the General Manager of Mumbai FC in the I-League prior to joining Mahindra United football club at the end of the 2006–2007 season. Menezes has been awarded the prestigious Shiv Chhatrapati Award the highest state award for excellence in sports by the Government of Maharastra.

AIFF
Menezes has held different roles in football administration. He is the Governing Council Member of the International Sports University, Maharashtra, and deputy chairman of All India Football Federation's technical committee. He also worked as the Chief Executive Officer (CEO) at the Western India Football Association (WIFA) which is the Governing body for football in the state of Maharashtra.

References

1964 births
Living people
Indian footballers
Association football goalkeepers
India international footballers
Footballers from Mumbai
Maharashtra football team players